Leland Wright (born September 29, 1986) is an American soccer player who last played for NSC Minnesota Stars in the USSF Division 2 Professional League.

Career

College and Amateur
Wright attended South Eugene High School, where he broke the school scoring record after notching 34 goals as a senior, and who he led to an Oregon state championship in 2002. He played club soccer for Oregon United, with whom he won four state championships, and was a member of his region's Olympic Development team from in 2003 and 2004.

He played one year of college soccer at the University of San Diego, and was voted his team's Freshman of the Year, before transferring to the University of Portland prior to his sophomore year.

During his college years he also played for Bradenton Academics in the USL Premier Development League.

Professional
Wright signed his first professional contract in 2010 when he was signed by the NSC Minnesota Stars of the USSF Division 2 Professional League. He made his professional debut on May 8, 2010, in a game against Montreal Impact.

References

External links
 Portland bio
 San Diego bio

Living people
1986 births
Sportspeople from Eugene, Oregon
Soccer players from Oregon
IMG Academy Bradenton players
Minnesota United FC (2010–2016) players
Portland Pilots men's soccer players
San Diego Toreros men's soccer players
USL League Two players
USSF Division 2 Professional League players
South Eugene High School alumni
Association football midfielders
American soccer players